A Harrington jacket (originally known only as a Baracuta jacket or a G9) is a lightweight, waist-length jacket made of cotton, polyester, wool or suede. Designs often incorporate traditional Fraser tartan or checkerboard-patterned lining.

History 

The first Harrington-style jackets were claimed to be made in the 1930s by the British clothing company, Baracuta. Baracuta's original design, the G9, is still in production.  The British company Grenfell, previously known as Haythornthwaite and Sons, also claims to have invented an identical jacket around the same time based on their golf jackets which is also still in production using their own signature cotton. The Harrington from either original source is based on lightweight, roomy jackets worn to play golf hence the G in the G4 or G9 naming convention for Baracuta. Both versions were originally made in Lancashire, England. Baracuta originally manufactured their jacket in Manchester whereas Grenfell were based in Burnley then London.

The character Rodney Harrington from the television series Peyton Place was so frequently seen wearing Baracuta jackets that the style of jacket came to be named after him.

Trademark
In France, HARRINGTON has been a registered trademark since 1985.

References

1960s fashion
1980s fashion
British fashion
Jackets